The Alberta Flying Heritage Museum was a proposed aviation museum for the Edmonton/Villeneuve Airport in Villeneuve, Alberta, Canada in order to move the Alberta Aviation Museum collection out of the City of Edmonton as a result of the closure of Edmonton City Centre Airport.

Development 

The museum was officially announced by Alberta Aviation Museum on 16 November 2013,

As part of the museum, the Alberta Aviation Museum's Boeing 737-200, ident C-GIPW, in Pacific Western Airlines (PWA) livery (Fleet #745) was restored to operational capability with the assistance of Canadian North and, on 29 November 2013, was flown to Villeneuve on a Schedule A Special Flight Permit issued by Transport Canada.

Changes in leadership at the Alberta Aviation Museum resulted in the Flying Heritage Museum no longer being pursued.  Efforts were undertaken to improve the existing Alberta Aviation Museum on Kingsway.  With a renewed lease from the City of Edmonton, the inside transformation of Hangar 14 began with exhibits being brought to life.

The Boeing 737-200 in Pacific Western Airlines (PWA) livery remains at Villeneuve and is a ground attraction at the Edmonton Airshow.  Please contact the Alberta Aviation Museum for use for filming or police or fire training operations.
   
As of October 5, 2018, no further development had been announced. The website's domain registration is also expired and the website is no longer available.

References 

Aerospace museums in Alberta